This is a list of resurrected species. So far, there is no scientifically verified method of DNA resurrection of a previously extinct species.

Cloning

Pyrenean Ibex 

The Pyrenean ibex (Capra pyrenaica pyrenaica) is an Iberian ibex subspecies with the unfortunate moniker of the first animal to go extinct twice. Endemic to the Pyrenees and Cantabrian Mountains, this ibex was driven to extinction due to competition with livestock and introduced wild ungulates. Several attempts were made to clone the Pyrenean ibex, and one individual was born to a domestic goat mother in 2003. However, this newborn died within minutes due to a lung defect.

Seed Germination

Judean Date Palm 

The Judean date palm is a cultivar of the date palm (Phoenix dactylifera) that is historically endemic to ancient Judea - modern Israel and Palestine. It is genetically unique, and closely related to modern Iraqi and Moroccan varieties.

A common agricultural crop in antiquity and the Middle Ages, the Judean date palm declined during the Ottoman Period in the region due to climatic changes and changing land use, and was confirmed extinct by the 19th Century. Between 1963 and 1991, archaeologists discovered Judean date seeds in excavation sites. through radiocarbon dating, they were determined to be between 1,900 and 2,300 years old. In 2008, researchers at the Arava Institute for Environmental Studies began to germinate the seeds. 

As of 2023, 7 Judean date palms have successfully germinated. In 2020, researchers began to harvest dates from these trees. Experiments to revive this cultivar are ongoing.

Thawing

 Known only from thawed specimens
 Pithovirus sibericum: 30,000 year old giant virus

 Already known from extant specimens prior to thawing
 Ancient form of Silene stenophylla: wild flower bloom 30,000 years of age.
 Nematode worms

See also 

 De-extinction
 Breeding back
 Lazarus taxon
 Rewilding

References

Extinction
Conservation biology
Emerging technologies